Lingnan University (LN/LU), formerly called Lingnan College, is a public liberal arts university in Hong Kong. It aims to provide students with an education in the liberal arts tradition and has joined the Global Liberal Arts Alliance since 2012. Lingnan University became the first university in Hong Kong to accomplish the goal of providing rich hostel experience for all undergraduates and currently, 80% Lingnan students are able to go on exchange for a term during their undergraduate study.

In 2015, Lingnan University was selected as one of the "Top 10 Asian Liberal Arts Colleges" by Forbes.

In 2020, the university ranked 2nd worldwide for “Quality Education” in the Times Higher Education University Impact Rankings 2020.

Lingnan University has 3 faculties, 16 departments, and 19 undergraduate degree programmes comprising a broad range of disciplines in humanities, social sciences and business administrations. All undergraduates are required to take 33 credits of Core Curriculum courses, 18 credits of Chinese and English language courses, 48 credits of major courses and 21 credits of free elective courses. Lingnan also offers a variety of taught masters, research masters and PhD programmes. Total students comprise more than 3,000 students.

At Lingnan University, a liberal arts education is achieved through the following:
Deliberately small enrollments
Broad-based curricula
Close faculty-student relationship
Rich residential life and extra-curricular activities
Active community service and multi-faceted workplace experience
Strong alumni and community support
Global learning opportunities

Research performance

UGC Research Assessment Exercise 2014 
The 2014 Research Assessment Exercise (RAE) published by University Grants Committee in Hong Kong shows that:

Department of Economics: ranks 3rd among all the eight UGC-funded institutions in its 4-star rating at 13%, which is above the sector-wide 11%, and LU is the only institution which does not have any research output in the “Unclassified” category among all Economics cost centers.
Department of History: has 15% 4-star rating, which puts the department in the 4th position among all institutions;
Department of Philosophy: has 45% of 4-star and 3-star outputs, which is just 3 points below the top institution and above the sector-wide 40%;
Department of Translation: has 15% of 4-star and 3-star outputs, which is the best result among all institutions and above the sector-wide 11%;
Department of Visual Studies: has 28% of 4-star and 3-star outputs, making LU ranks second among the institutions and is above the sector-wide 19% (in the “Other Arts/Humanities” cost centre );
Social Studies: has 25% 4-star and 3-star outputs. LU ranks second among the institutions and is above the sector-wide 19%.

UGC General Research Fund (GRF) Results 2015/16 
LU's overall success rate of 36.1% ranks second among the institutions and is above the sector-wide 34.9%.

Humanities and Social Sciences: LU's success rate of 47.4% is the highest among the institutions and above the sector-wide 32.7%.
Humanities & Creative Arts: LU's 80% success rate is top among the institutions (sector-wide 40.6%).
Mechanical, Production & Industrial Engineering: Together with another institution, LU takes the second position among all with a success rate of 50%, and is not far from the top rate of 56.4%.
Education: LU's success rate is 100% while the sector average is 34%.

UGC Early Career Scheme (ECS) Results 2015/16 
LU's success rate of 71.4% is the highest among the institutions while the sector average is 39.9%.

Humanities and Social Sciences: LU also comes first under this panel with a success rate of 66.7% while the sector average is 34.3%.
Humanities & Creative Arts: LU's success rate is 100% and the sector average is 47.8%, which makes it rank third in terms of the total amount of funds obtained in this discipline.
Business Studies (with Economics): LU's success rate is 100% while the sector average is 33.8%.

History

Canton Period 

Lingnan University was founded as Canton Christian College in Guangzhou, China as a Non-Denominational Christian university by Andrew P. Happer of the American Presbyterian (North) Council in 1889. The school changed location several times over the years. In 1900, the school relocated to Macau due to the Boxer Rebellion. The school moved back to Guangzhou and built a permanent campus at the Haizhu District in 1904. The university moved to Hong Kong for the first time in 1938 after Guangzhou fell to the Japanese military. The university stayed in Hong Kong for 4 years before moving to Shaoguan after Hong Kong's capitulation to the Japanese forces. After World War II concluded, Lingnan University moved back to its permanent campus at Haizhu.

Lingnan School 
After the 1949 revolution in China, the university remained in Guangzhou, and was merged into Sun Yat-sen University in 1952. In 1967, the Lingnan Secondary School board of directors, along with the Lingnan University Hong Kong Alumnus Club and Lingnan Club founded the Lingnan Education Expansion Council, and began to organise the Lingnan School in Hong Kong. In the formative years, the school only provided preparatory form (Sixth Form) education and non-degree programmes. During the 1970s, Lingnan School began to offer diploma programmes in such subjects as liberal arts, commerce, and social science.

Lingnan College 
At the end of 1978, the colonial government in Hong Kong issued a White Paper on post-secondary education. Lingnan accepted the government's suggestions, and abolished the 4-year system that is used in other universities around the world in favour of the "2-2-1" regimen (2 years of preparatory courses, 2 years of study for higher diplomas, 1 more year for an honours diploma). At the same time, the school was registered as an Approved Post Secondary College, and changed its name to Lingnan College.

During the 1980s, the school began to focus its resources on Social Science, Commerce, and Literature programmes, and shut down its other programmes, such as Music and Science, to conserve funding. In 1985, an interdisciplinary degree programme was established.

Lingnan's speed of development increased as the 80s drew to an end, due to the colonial Hong Kong government's policy of expanding higher education. At the same time, the preparatory courses that were first mandated by the government in 1978 were steadily abolished.

Lingnan University 

In 1991, the Lingnan College received funding from the Hong Kong government directly after it passed an academic accreditation review from the Hong Kong Council for Academic Accreditation (HKCAA).

During the 1990s, the university's development as a Liberal Arts university was confirmed by the school's board, and the school moved to its permanent location in Tuen Mun in 1995, the former site of Bowring Camp, a British Forces barracks. The school began to receive authorisation to open bachelor courses in 1992, then master courses in 1996, eventually receiving self-accreditation status and full recognition as a university by the government in 1998, and renaming the institution as Lingnan University on 30 July 1999.

In 2007, Professor Edward Chen retired after his 12 years as president. Professor Yuk-Shee Chan, ex-vice-president of Hong Kong University of Science and Technology become the new president. Lingnan University is now preparing the new "334" system which is planned for introduction in 2012; in the new system, a new 120-credit programme will be divided into parts, e.g. General Education, Ethics.
In addition, to prepare for the four-year university system, construction of Lingnan University's new academic building, Simon and Eleanor Kwok Building, has been completed, providing more teaching and learning facilities for the Faculty of Business.
Located adjacent to the existing campus and near Fu Tai Estate, the Simon and Eleanor Kwok Building is built on a 4,674-square metre site and has a gross floor area of 5,178 square metres.

In 2015, Lingnan University established Science Unit to offer science courses and minors. In 2017, Wong Bing Lai Music and Performing Arts Unit was established.

Academic organisations

Faculties and departments

Faculty of Arts 
Department of Chinese
Department of Cultural Studies
Department of English
Department of History
Department of Philosophy
Department of Translation
Department of Visual Studies
Centre for English and Additional Languages (CEAL)
Chinese Language Education and Assessment Centre (CLEAC)
Animation and Digital Arts Programme Office
Wong Bing Lai Music and Performing Arts Unit

Faculty of Social Sciences 
Office of the Faculty of Social Sciences
Department of Applied Psychology
Department of Economics
Department of Political Science
Department of Sociology and Social Policy

Faculty of Business 
Department of Accountancy
Department of Computing and Decision Sciences
Department of Finance and Insurance
Department of Management
Department of Marketing and International Business

School of Graduate Studies

School of Interdisciplinary Studies 
Wong Bing Lai Music and Performing Arts Unit

Core Curriculum and General Education Office 
Science Unit

Student life

Representative Council

Executive Council 

† Resigned
‡ Added

Press Bureau 

† Resigned
‡ Added

Business Administration Society 

Senate of Business Administration Society of Lingnan University Students' Union
Executive Committee of Business Administration Society of Lingnan University Students' Union

Students' Residence 
Lingnan considers "hostel life" (life in college dormitories) a form of informal education. As a result, all full-time undergraduate students are required to stay at student hostels on campus for at least one academic year while at the university. A majority of students stay for two academic years. Newly admitted four-year students are required to be residents of student hostels for at least two years, and are guaranteed full residence throughout their stay should they agree upon it.

In addition to another new student hostel building under construction, there are currently eight blocks of student hostels in Lingnan University; each hostel holds an estimated 250 people.

Controversies

July 2019: Students and alumni petition for dismissing Junius Ho from the University Council 
After the 2019 Yuen Long attack, a video of Junius Ho circulated widely online. In the video, Junius Ho, who was a member of the University Council, was found shaking hands and taking photos with the white-clad mob who attacked civilians in Yuen Long. Ho claimed that he was not involved in the attack, but many students and alumni had no confidence in him. A number of student bodies and alumni associations made declarations condemning his hate speech and support for the attackers, saying that it seriously affected the image of Lingnan University. They also jointly requested Chief Executive Carrie Lam to dismiss Junius Ho from the University Council. The university issued a statement afterwards stating the irrelevancy between the stance of university and the actions of Ho. The statement also highlighted their respect for freedom of speech.

Tiananmen relief removing 
The Tiananmen relief, commemorating the 1989 Tiananmen Square protests and massacre, an artwork by Chen Weiming, was removed on 24 December 2021 by University authorities, because they "reviewed and assessed items on campus that may pose legal and safety risks to the university community." The same time, similar Tiananmen protests' memorial artworks were removed all over Hong Kong. Chen Weiming said about the actions that authorities removed the artwork during night, because "they were afraid of exposure and of a backlash from students and alumni.This incident shows that CCP is oppressing the right of free speech in Hong Kong.This act is widely regarded by the public as a violation of Hong Kong as the last land under the rule of the CCP where people can discuss and commemorate the protests and massacre,and an injury to freedom,democracy and human rights."

Notable alumni

Office of Service-Learning 

In 2006, Lingnan University became the first local university to establish an Office of Service-Learning.

From 2007 to 2013, the Office of Service-Learning and Lingnan University jointly organised the biennial 1st to 4th Asia-Pacific Regional Conference on Service-Learning.

See also 
 Liberal Arts
 Lingnan University Library
 Education in Hong Kong
 List of universities in Hong Kong
 List of buildings and structures in Hong Kong

References

External links 

Fu Tei
Lingnan University
Educational institutions established in 1888
Association of Christian Universities and Colleges in Asia
1888 establishments in Hong Kong